Stackhousiaceae R.Br. is an obsolete family of plants, now merged into the family Celastraceae. When accepted, it comprised the following genera:

 Macgregoria
 Stackhousia
 Tripterococcus

References 

Celastraceae
Rosid families
Historically recognized angiosperm families